Caroline Cecil, known professionally as WHIPPED CREAM, is a Canadian DJ and producer based on Vancouver Island. She is currently signed to Big Beat Records. She released her major label debut EP, Who Is Whipped Cream?, in August 2020 on Big Beat.

Early life and education

Caroline Cecil was born in Toronto, Ontario. She and her family later moved to the Vancouver Island suburb of Nanaimo. She began ice skating at age two and was enrolled in professional figure skating lessons by age seven. She became a competitive figure skater at age eight and spent much of her youth traveling throughout Canada and the United States, competing in figure skating competitions. Her success at these events led to aspirations of joining the Canadian Olympic team. When she was 18, however, Cecil suffered a severe broken ankle while practicing triple toe loops. The injury required surgery that resulted in the insertion of a metal plate and six pins in her ankle. Although she was able to recover, she opted to forgo figure skating to pursue a career in music. Cecil is a graduate of Woodlands Secondary School in Nanaimo.

Career

In 2012, Cecil attended the Sasquatch! Music Festival where she watched a performance by Active Child that spurred her to create her own music. Using Ableton Live and a Traktor controller, she learned how to produce tracks over the next two years. She released her first single as Whipped Cream in 2014. In 2015, she released her first EP, Law of Attraction, through Unspeakable Records. She also made her first appearance as a performer at the Shambhala Music Festival in Salmo, British Columbia. In 2016, she premiered several tracks on Skrillex's Nest HQ platform. In early 2017, Whipped Cream released a collaborative EP with Hekler called Mirrors. Throughout 2017, she performed at several festivals, including Life in Color and Hardfest. In September of that year, she released a solo EP, Persistence, through Nest HQ. The lead single off that collection, "Ignorant", has accrued over 7 million streams on Spotify.

In 2018, she released several tracks including "LUV" through Big Beat Records and "Blood" via Deadbeats. She followed that with two early 2019 releases on Diplo's Mad Decent label: "You Wanted It" and "Time" (featuring DeathByRomy). Whipped Cream made further appearances at music festivals in 2019, including at Ultra, Lollapalooza, Electric Daisy Carnival, Bonnaroo, and others. In November of that year, it was announced that Whipped Cream had been signed to the Atlantic imprint, Big Beat Records. She also released the single, "Told Ya" featuring Lil Xan.

In February 2020, her song, "So Thick" featuring Baby Goth, appeared on the soundtrack for the film, Birds of Prey. She went on to release several other singles that year, including "DUMB SH!T" (featuring Jasiah), "I Do The Most" (featuring Lil Keed), and "I Won't Let You Fall" (featuring Finn Askew). These songs would later appear on Whipped Cream's debut major label EP, Who Is Whipped Cream? (stylized in all caps), which was released in August 2020 through Big Beat and Atlantic.

Discography

Extended plays

Singles

References

External links
Official website

Musicians from Vancouver Island
Musicians from Toronto
People from Nanaimo
Canadian women record producers
Big Beat Records (American record label) artists
Atlantic Records artists
Canadian DJs
Canadian hip hop record producers
Living people
Owsla artists
Mad Decent artists
Monstercat artists
Remixers
1991 births